Trudovoye is the name of several places in Russia:

Russia
 Trudovoye, Amur Oblast
 Trudovoye, Nizhny Novgorod Oblast
 Trudovoye, Sol-Iletsky District, Orenburg Oblast
 Trudovoye, Tashlinsky District, Orenburg Oblast
 Trudovoye, Primorsky Krai
 Trudovoye, Sakhalin Oblast
 Trudovoye, Saratov Oblast
 Trudovoye, Stavropol Krai
 Trudovoye, Voronezh Oblast

See also
 Trudovoy
 Trudovaya